Edward Fairfax Neild Sr.  (December 3, 1884 – July 6, 1955), was an American architect originally from Shreveport, Louisiana. He designed the Harry S. Truman Presidential Library and Museum in Independence, Missouri. He was selected for the task by U.S. President Harry Truman.

Biography

He was in partnerships Neild, Somdal and Neild, Somdal, Neild, with Dewey A. Somdal (1898-1973) and with his son, Edward Fairfax Nield Jr. (October 7, 1908 – November 8, 1958). Somdal Associates, Shreveport, is the descendant of the Neild firm.

Neild served as president of the Shreveport chapter of the American Institute of Architects (AIA) in 1926 and from 1937 to 1939; Dewey Somdal was the president from 1940 to 1943; Edward F. Nield Jr., in 1951. In 1948, Neild was among twenty distinguished architects selected as fellows of the American Institute of Architects.
 
Other Neild-designed buildings in Shreveport include: the Louisiana State Exhibit Building at the Louisiana State Fairgrounds, Schumpert Hospital, Barret Elementary School, C. E. Byrd High School, the Scottish Rite Cathedral, the Calanthean Temple, Cathedral of St. John Berchmans (Shreveport, Louisiana), and the Overton Brooks Veterans Administration Medical Center.

A number of Neild's works have been listed on the National Register of Historic Places as significant buildings for their architecture. Nield's son, Edward F. Neild Jr. (1908 - 1958), was also an architect and designed the Hirsch Memorial Coliseum in Shreveport. From 1937 to 1938, the two men worked together on the Louisiana State Exhibit Museum in Shreveport, which opened in 1939.

Neild died in Kansas City, Missouri, at the age of seventy. The Neilds are interred at Forest Park Cemetery East in Shreveport.

Works
Other Neild works include (with attribution):
Arlington Ridge Park, NW corner of N. Meade St. and Marshall Dr. Arlington, Virginia (Neild, Edward F.), NRHP
B'Nai Zion Temple, 802 Cotton St. Shreveport  Neild, Edward F.), NRHP
Baton Rouge Junior High School (built 1922), 1100 Laurel St. Baton Rouge Neild, Edward F.), NRHP
Bogard Hall-Louisiana Tech University, Junction of Arizona and College St. Ruston, Louisiana Neild, Somdal & Neild), NRHP
Bossier High School, 322 Colquitt St. Bossier City, LA Neild, Edward F.), NRHP
Byrd, C. E., High School, 3201 Line Ave. Shreveport, LA Neild, Edward F.), NRHP
Capital City Press Building, 340 Florida Baton Rouge, LA Neild, Edward F.), NRHP
Fair Park High School, 3222 Greenwood Rd. Shreveport, LA Neild, Edward F.), NRHP
Heidelberg Hotel, 201 Lafayette St. Baton Rouge, LA Neild, Edward F.), NRHP
Heidelberg Hotel and Hotel King (boundary increase) 200 Lafayette St. Baton Rouge  Neild, Edward F.), NRHP
John M. Parker Agricultural Coliseum

 
Howard Auditorium-Louisiana Tech University, Jct. of Adams Blvd. and Arizona St. Ruston Neild, Somdal & Neild), NRHP
Keeny Hall-Louisiana Tech University, Keeny Circle Ruston, LA Neild, Somdal & Neild), NRHP
One or more works in Lake Charles Historic District, Roughly bounded by Iris, Hodges, Lawrence, Kirkman, S. Divission and Louisiana Lake Charles, LA Neild, Edward F.), NRHP
Louisiana State Exhibit Museum in Shreveport, 3015 Greenwood Road, Shreveport, LA 71109
Maricopa County Courthouse, 125 W. Washington St. Phoenix, Arizona Neild, Edward F.), NRHP-listed
Mooringsport School, 602 Latimer St. Mooringsport, Louisiana Neild, Edward F.), NRHP
Mooringsport Masonic Lodge, Croom St. Mooringsport, Louisiana Neild, Edward F.), NRHP
Prescott Memorial Library-Louisiana Tech University, Keeny Circle Ruston, LA Neild, Somdal & Neild), NRHP
Rayville High School, 109 Madeline St., Rayville, Louisiana Neild, Edward F.), NRHP
Reese Agriculture Building-Louisiana Tech University, Tech Farm, US 80 Ruston Neild, Somdal & Neild), NRHP
Robinson Hall-Louisiana Tech University, Madison Ave. Ruston Neild, Somdal & Neild), NRHP
Scott Street School, 900 N. 19th St. Baton Rouge  Neild, Edward F.), NRHP
Scottish Rite Cathedral, 725 Cotton St. Shreveport Neild, Edward F.), NRHP
Shreveport Municipal Building, 724 McNeil St., Shreveport  Neild, Edward F.), NRHP
Steere, A. C., Elementary School, 4009 Youree Dr. Shreveport, LA Neild, Edward Fairfax), NRHP
Toliver Dining Hall-Louisiana Tech University, Wisteria St. Ruston, LA Neild, Somdal & Neild), NRHP
US Post Office and Courthouse-Alexandria, 515 Murray St. Alexandria, Louisiana Neild, Edward F.), NRHP
Wray-Dickinson Building, 308 Market St., Shreveport  Neild, Edward F.), NRHP

References

External links

1884 births
1955 deaths
20th-century American architects
Architects from Louisiana
People from Shreveport, Louisiana
Tulane University alumni
Harry S. Truman
Fellows of the American Institute of Architects